Morten Giæver (born 20 May 1982) is a Norwegian football midfielder who most recently played for Moss FK.

Career
He was born in Alta, but moved to Tromsø at the age of two. As a footballer he came through the youth system of Tromsø IL; made his first-team debut in a friendly match in 1999 and then in the Norwegian Premier League in August 2000. He got three Premier League games in 2000 and 2001. In addition, while at Tromsø he spent some time on loan in Finnsnes IL.

After the 2001 season he joined IF Skarp. Ahead of the 2006 season he joined Tromsdalen UIL. After four seasons at TUIL he joined Sarpsborg 08 in 2010, where he helped the team achieving promotion to Tippeligaen, both in 2010 and 2012 (relegated in 2011).

Among Tromsø IL fans Giæver is still remembered for an incident in his first senior league match when he came on as a substitute in a home game against Molde FK in 2000. Six minutes into stoppage time Tromsø, that were trailing one goal, were awarded a penalty, and surprising the home crowd (and reportedly the Tromsø staff and players as well) Giæver, then aged 18, stepped up. He blasted the penalty wide, effectively wasting the occasion for a late equalizer. Some cite the incident (and the ensuing ill treatment by fans as well as fellow players) as one of the reasons Giæver, considered to hold great potential and to be as promising as fellow junior Morten Gamst Pedersen, never became a big hit at Alfheim.

In 2004, he was sentenced to two weeks in prison for refusing mandatory military service.

Career statistics 

Source:

References

External links

1982 births
Living people
Sportspeople from Tromsø
Norwegian footballers
Tromsø IL players
Eliteserien players
Tromsdalen UIL players
Sarpsborg 08 FF players
Ullensaker/Kisa IL players
Bærum SK players
Moss FK players
Norwegian First Division players
Norwegian Second Division players
Norwegian prisoners and detainees
Prisoners and detainees of Norway
Association football midfielders
People from Alta, Norway